The 1931–32 1re série season was the 16th season of the 1re série, the top level of ice hockey in France. Stade Français won their first championship.

Tournament

Semifinals
 Stade Français - Club des Sports d’Hiver de Paris 14:1
 Racing Club de France - Chamonix Hockey Club (Forfeit)

Final
 Stade Français - Racing Club de France 3:2 OT (0:0, 1:1, 1:1, 1:0)

External links
Season on hockeyarchives.info

Fra
1931 in French sport
1931–32 in French ice hockey
Ligue Magnus seasons